Arthur Antoine was a state legislator in Louisiana. He represented Saint Mary Parish in the Louisiana House of Representatives from 1872 to 1874 along with Isaac Sutton. 

Charles Vincent documented him as having been born in Louisiana and "mulatto". He served on the Committee on Land and Levees as well.as the Committee on Pensions.

References

Members of the Louisiana House of Representatives

Year of birth missing
African-American politicians during the Reconstruction Era
People from St. Mary Parish, Louisiana
African-American state legislators in Louisiana
Year of death missing